Wola (plural wole) in the Polish–Lithuanian Commonwealth, (in Latin libera villa, libertas) was a name given to agricultural villages, appearing as early as the first half of the thirteenth century and historically constituting a separate category of settlements in Poland, by comparison to others, in terms of the populace used to settle them and the freedoms they were granted. These settlers were given plots of land and exemption for a certain number of years (up to 20) from all rents, fees, and taxes, and in most cases separate institutions and charters based on either the Magdeburg law, or its local variants.

The names Wola or Wolka ("Little Wola"), usually qualified by an adjective, form part of the names of hundreds of villages in Poland. 

The practice of establishing wole is known as Wolnizna in Polish. Previously  was known as lgota or 'ligota", which in Old Polish means "relief", referring to tax reliefs for settlers. Accordingly, quite a few Polish settlements have names  Ligota, Ligotka, Lhota, Lgota, etc.

See also
 Lhota, a similar concept in Czech history
 Sloboda, a similar concept in Russian history
 Wola, now a borough of Warsaw
 Wola (disambiguation)

References

Polish–Lithuanian Commonwealth
Populated places in Poland